Taylor Park may refer to:

In the United States
Taylor Park Reservoir, Colorado
General James Taylor Park, Kentucky
Pete Taylor Park, Mississippi

Elsewhere
Taylor Park, England
Fred Taylor Park, New Zealand

See also
Samuel P. Taylor State Park, California